Viktoropol is a rural locality (a settlement) and the administrative center of Viktoropolskoye Rural Settlement, Veydelevsky District, Belgorod Oblast, Russia. The population was 1,144 as of 2010. There are 14 streets.

Geography 
Viktoropol is located 10 km south of Veydelevka (the district's administrative centre) by road. Opytny is the nearest rural locality.

References 

Rural localities in Veydelevsky District